DYPR may refer to:
 A callsign used by Palawan Broadcasting Corporation in Palawan:
 DYAP-AM, a defunct AM radio station broadcasting in Puerto Princesa previously used the callsign DYPR-AM
 DYPR-TV (Palawan), a defunct television station in Palawan
 DYPR-TV, a television station broadcasting in Tacloban as PRTV